Vendasta Square (originally named Saskatoon Square) is a 17-story  office tower in downtown Saskatoon, Saskatchewan. It is located at the northeast corner of 22nd Street East and 4th Avenue North. It was built in 1979 and is the eleventh tallest building in Saskatoon and the tallest office tower.

In December 2010, the building was sold to Dundee Real Estate Investment Trust for $50 million. The building was previously owned by a partnership consisting of SaskTel, MacPherson, Leslie & Tyerman, the Saskatoon Health District and Commerce Holdings. SaskTel owned 70% of the building with remaining partners each holding 10%.

A seventh-storey window broke and fell to the street below on January 15, 2014.

Major renovations of the 16th and 17th floors took place in 2020 and 2021. They included extension of the usable floor space on the 17th, the addition of a commercial kitchen and a rooftop patio with walk out access from the 16th floor dining room.

It was renamed from Saskatoon Square to Vendasta Square in November 2022

References

External links

Buildings and structures in Saskatoon
Office buildings completed in 1979